The Pacific Northwest tree octopus is an Internet hoax created in 1998 by a humor writer under the pseudonym Lyle Zapato. Since its creation, the Pacific Northwest tree octopus website has been commonly referenced in Internet literacy classes in schools and has been used in multiple studies demonstrating children's gullibility regarding online sources of information.

Description 

This fictitious endangered species of cephalopod was given the Latin name "Octopus paxarbolis" (the species name being coined from Latin pax, the root of Pacific, and Spanish arbol meaning "tree"). It was purportedly able to live both on land and in water, and was said to live in the Olympic National Forest and nearby rivers, spawning in water where its eggs are laid. Its major predator was said to be the Sasquatch.

Reception 

In 2018, the website was selected as one of 30 websites to form the initial collection of the Library of Congress's Web Culture's Web Archive.

Internet literacy studies

Design
Leu et al. (2007) conducted an empirical study on 13-year old US school children's ability to critically evaluate online information for reliability. The sample included the top quartile of school children (n=53) in samples from the states of Connecticut and South Carolina. Each school child was exposed to the spoof site "Save The Northwest Pacific Tree Octopus", devoted to this rare species of octopus, complete with pictures of the animal itself and its environment. The school children then received a short, fictitious, message from another class, asking them to locate and evaluate the reliability of the website. They were to provide three reasons for their answer, and summarize the most important information from that website in one or two sentences. Then they were asked to send their information via IM, email, or to post this on a blog site. Following the activity, school children were interviewed to ensure that they were familiar with the term "reliable," an important concept in the task.  When asked what this term meant, all responded with answers indicating that they understood the term (e.g., "It means that you can trust it;" "It means it will always be there for you;" or "It's like a friend that you can trust").

In the spring of 2017, Loos, Ivan & Leu (2018) replicated the study in a Dutch school class of 27 children (13 girls and 14 boys, 11/12 years old) in the following way: The teacher and the school children were told by the first author of the study that the lesson that would follow would be an online reading comprehension exercise; the real purpose of the lesson was not revealed in advance. The children were asked by the scholar to visit the abovementioned website. They were given the following instructions: "Have a look at this website. Look at the pictures, click on the links if you wish. Do not hurry, you have time enough. And this is not a test. It will not be graded." The website was automatically translated to Dutch, a facility offered by the Chromebook they all used. Then, they were asked to answer the following questions:
 This website presents an octopus living in trees. What country does this animal live in?
 According to the website, this particular octopus is an endangered species. For what reason?
  If Greenpeace were to ask you to save this octopus, would you support this and sign? YES, because ... NO, because ... (choose one)
 Were there parts of the website you didn't understand? If so, please explain.
 Are there any other comments about this website you would like to make?" Hence, these school children thought the text was about their willingness to undertake action for an endangered animal. 

The pupils who answered 'YES' to question (3) were judged as perceiving the site as a reliable one. In this way, it was not necessary to explicitly ask about the reliability of the site, which would have risked priming them. The school children were debriefed after the session and they received a new media literacies training.

Results
The 2007 US study found that slightly more than half (27) of the 53 school children taking part in the study reported the website as being very reliable. Only 6 out of the 53 school children (11%) viewed the website as unreliable. Each of these 6 school children had just participated in a lesson that used this website to teach them to be suspicious of information online.

In the 2017 Dutch study only 2 out of the total 27 school children (7%) recognized that the website was a hoax. The setting of the task (school environment), the trust in their teacher and the scholar, and the emotional involvement (the topic was an animal in danger) might have made it more difficult for them to perceive the information on the website as fake. Several told the scholar they were shocked that they had considered the digital information on the website to be reliable, as they had received several lessons in new literacy training at school over the past year.

See also 
 Drop bear
 Spaghetti-tree hoax

References

External links
 Official site
   Professor Leu's teaching tool.

1998 hoaxes
Fictional octopuses
Hoaxes in science
Hoaxes in the United States
Internet hoaxes